Camille Recht was a German writer, critic and editor. Recht wrote the introduction to the Eugène Atget monograph Lichtbilder and edited a collection of nineteenth century photography Die Alte Photographie.

References

German editors
German art critics
Year of death missing
Year of birth missing
German women writers